Platensina diaphasis is a species of tephritid or fruit flies in the genus Platensina of the family Tephritidae.

Distribution
Ivory Coast & Tanzania to South Africa, Madagascar.

References

Tephritinae
Insects described in 1891
Taxa named by Jacques-Marie-Frangile Bigot
Diptera of Africa